Muthulingam (Tamil:முத்துலிங்கம்)  (born 20 March 1942) is an Indian songwriter. He wrote over 1,500 Tamil film songs, and was the winner of Kalaimamani, Bavender Bharathidasan Award, Best Songwriter Award, Artist Award. He is a former royal poet and a former upper house member.

Early life 
Muthulingam was born in 1942  in Kadambangudi, Sivagangai district . Self-employment, agriculture . Educated till the final class of school. He wrote his first poem when he was 15 years old.

Awards 
 Kapilar Award of the Government of Tamil Nadu for the year 2013
 Bavender Bharathidasan Award
 Kalaithurai Vidhdhakar Award
 Kalaimamani Award - 1981

Filmography

Lyricist

1970's 

 1973– Ponnukku Thanga Manasu
 1976– Uzhaikkum Karangal
 1976– Oorukku Uzhaippavan
 1976– Unarchigal
 1977– Meenava Nanban
 1977– Indru Pol Endrum Vaazhga
 1978– Madhuraiyai Meetta Sundharapandiyan
 1978– Vayasu Ponnu
 1978– Kizhakke Pogum Rail
 1978– En Kelvikku Enna Bathil
 1979– Puthiya Vaarpugal
 1979– Uthiripookkal
 1979– Suvarilladha Chiththirangal
 1979– Pappathi
 1979– Kamasasthiram

Actor
Maya Kannadi (2007) - struggling actor

References 

Living people
1942 births
Tamil film poets
Tamil-language lyricists
Tamil poets